Pine Valley is a valley in Reynolds County in the U.S. state of Missouri.

Pine Valley was so named on account of pine timber within the valley.

References

Valleys of Reynolds County, Missouri
Valleys of Missouri